Hoseynabad-e Qaleh (also Romanized as Ḩōseynābād-e Qal‘eh; also known as Ḩōseynābād) is a village in Zarrineh Rud-e Jonubi Rural District, in the Central District of Miandoab County, West Azerbaijan Province, Iran. At the 2006 census, its population was 224, in 48 families.

References 

Populated places in Miandoab County